"True" a song by American musician Ryan Cabrera, released as the second single from his second studio album, Take It All Away (2004), on October 11, 2004. The song peaked at number 18 on the US Billboard Hot 100 and number eight on the Billboard Mainstream Top 40 in January 2005.

Track listings
US promo CD 1
 "True" – 3:24

US promo CD 2
 "True" (album version) – 3:24
 "True" (Spanglish version) – 3:25
 "True" (Spanish version) – 3:30

Credits are personnel
Credits are lifted from the Take It All Away booklet.

Studios
 Recorded at Ocean Way Recording Studio B and John Rzeznik's house (Los Angeles)
 Mixed at Ocean Way Recording Studio D (Los Angeles)

Personnel

 Ryan Cabrera – writing, vocals, acoustic guitar, production
 Jimmy Harry – writing
 Sheppard Solomon – writing
 Greg Suran – electric guitars
 Paul Bushnell – bass

 Gregg Bissonette – drums, percussion
 John Rzeznik – production
 Doug McKean – engineering, mixing
 Evan Lamberg – executive album production

Charts

Weekly charts

Year-end charts

Certifications

Release history

References

2004 singles
2004 songs
Atlantic Records singles
Music videos directed by Kevin Kerslake
Ryan Cabrera songs
Songs written by Jimmy Harry
Songs written by Ryan Cabrera
Songs written by Sheppard Solomon